Privileged is a 1982 film notable for being the first theatrical release from the Oxford Film Foundation and the screen debut of Hugh Grant, Imogen Stubbs, Mark Williams, and James Wilby. Directed by Michael Hoffman with John Schlesinger, produced by Rick Stevenson (as Richard Stevenson), the film is about a group of Oxford student partygoers, with elements of a whodunit.

The classical score is by Rachel Portman in her film debut at the age of 22, and the film also uses dance tracks by Oxford student band "Kudos Points" whose members included Charlie Mole (who went on to compose film scores in his own right).

The screenplay includes a play within a play as several of the characters are vying for a role in a student production of The Duchess of Malfi.

Cast
 Robert Woolley as Edward
 Diana Katis as Anne
 Hugh Grant as Lord Adrian (credited as Hughie Grant)
 Victoria Studd as Lucy
 James Wilby as Jamie
 Simon Shackleton as Justin
 Imogen Stubbs as Imogen
 Mark Williams as Wilf
 Neville Watchurst as Julian
 Michael Hoffman as Alan
 Jenny Waldman as Waitress
 Ted Coleman as Barman
 Stefan Bednarczyk as Pianist (credited as Stefan Bednarcyzk)

External links
 

1982 films
1980s mystery comedy-drama films
British mystery comedy-drama films
Films directed by Michael Hoffman
Films scored by Rachel Portman
1982 directorial debut films
1982 comedy films
1982 drama films
1980s English-language films
1980s British films